Tobias Willi  (born 14 December 1979 in Freiburg) is a German former professional football midfielder who played for SC Freiburg, Austria Salzburg, and MSV Duisburg.

External links
 Profile at Kicker.de 
 

1979 births
Living people
Association football midfielders
German footballers
Germany under-21 international footballers
SC Freiburg players
MSV Duisburg players
Bundesliga players
2. Bundesliga players